ICstat, "Centro per la Cooperazione Statistica Internazionale - Luigi Bodio" (International Cooperation Center for Statistics) is a non-profit association, based in Rome, created on April 1st, 1996. The Association promotes the international cooperation in the field of statistics, economics and law. ICstat  co-ordinates technical assistance projects financed by international institutions (EC, World Bank, FAO, MAE etc.) and is particularly involved in several Transition and Developing Countries. The Association supports democratic governance, crisis prevention and recovery, human rights application and monitoring systems, post-conflict political elections and referendum. Moreover ICstat produces studies for scientific and  policy purposes.

See also
 Sustainable development
 Development economics
 Economic development

Further reading
 CALZARONI M., CAPPIELLO A., DELLA ROCCA G., DI ZIO M., MARTELLI C., PIERACCINI G., TEMBE C., 2005 "O Sector Informal em Moçambique: Resultados do Primeiro Inquérito Nacional (2005) - The Informal Sector in Mozambique: Results of the First National Survey (2005). INE-Mozambique, Maputo", INE Mozambique
 Giorgio D'AMORE, 2006 "Mapping existing global systems and initiatives", Water monitoring, FAO UN-Water
 Aline PENNISI (Editorial project and co-ordination: 2000). Maritime Transport in the MED Countries, 2000 - Le Transport maritime dans les pays MED, 2000 Eurostat 
 Aline PENNISI, (Editorial project and co-ordination: 2000) Air Transport in the MED Countries, 1998-2000 - Le Transport aèrien dans les pays MED, 1998-2000, Eurostat 
 Antonio CAPPIELLO, 2004 "Considerazioni sui recenti censimenti dell'agricolutra, dell'industria e dei servizi in Mozambico. (Considerations on the last Censuses of Agriculture, Industry and Service carried out by INE Mozambique)", Rivista italiana di economia demografia e statistica, volume LVIII n. 3/4.
 Antonio CAPPIELLO, 2006 "I currency board come strumento di stabilizzazione economica: come funzionano e dove sono adottati (Currency boards: how they work and where they are adopted). Quaderni di Studi Europei. GIUFFRÉ, VOLUME 1/2006. Centro di Ricerca de "La Sapienza" in Studi europei ed internazionali Eurosapienza.
 Antonio CAPPIELLO, 2008 "Estimating Non Observed Economy", Journal of Economic and Social Measurement. Vol. 33 n. 1, 2008 ISSN 0747-9662

External links 
 ICstat Home page
 Eurostat
 OECD
 Cooperazione Italiana
 FAO Statistics
 ISTAT

Economics societies
Statistical societies
Population organizations
Non-profit organisations based in Italy
Organisations based in Rome
International economic organizations
International organizations based in Europe